Marita Skogum (born 3 January 1961) is a Swedish orienteering competitor.  She won the 1989 Individual World Orienteering Championships, as well as the 1993 Classic distance. She also obtained silver in the Individual course in 1983, and silver in the Short distance in 1993.  She is four times Relay World Champion, from 1983, 1989, 1991 and 1993, as a member of the Swedish winning teams, and has a silver medal from 1987.

Skogum has been coach for the Swedish Women's National Team from 2001, and was nominated for "Swedish Trainer of the Year 2004". She has been coach for the Men's National Team from 2006.

References

1961 births
Living people
Swedish orienteers
Female orienteers
Foot orienteers
World Orienteering Championships medalists
Swedish sports coaches
Orienteering coaches